The 2013 International Bernese Ladies Cup was held from January 11 to 13 at the Curlingbahn Allmend in Bern, Switzerland as part of the 2012–13 World Curling Tour. The event was held in a triple-knockout format, and the purse for the event was CHF20,000, of which the winner, Silvana Tirinzoni, received CHF6,000.

Teams
The teams are listed as follows:

Knockout results
The draw is listed as follows:

A event

B event

C event

Playoffs

References

External links

International Bernese Ladies Cup
International Bernese Ladies Cup
Women's curling competitions in Switzerland
International sports competitions hosted by Switzerland
2013 in women's curling
2013 in Swiss women's sport